Route 1 was a previous number used for a major highway in the Canadian province of Quebec. The highway stretched from Montreal, through the Eastern Townships and the city of Sherbrooke, to Quebec City.

In the mid-1970s, as part of Quebec's renumbering scheme, Route 1 was replaced by the following routes:

References

01